Rissoa is a genus of minute sea snails, marine gastropod mollusks or micromollusks in the family Rissoidae.

The genus was first introduced by M. de Freminville for some small shells observed by M. Antoine Risso, a distinguished naturalist of Nice, France. They were described by M. Demarest in 1814 in the "New Bulletin of the Philomatic Society".

Description
The soft body of the snail is elongated and spiral. The somewhat prolonged mouth has a proboscis. The tentacles are awl-shaped with the eyes on a small prominence near the base. The foot is oval or elliptical. The species is phytophagous.

The conical shell has an elongated spire with its apex nipple-shaped. The size of the shell varies between 1 mm and 8 mm. The whorls are generally convex-shaped with a distinct suture. The aperture is ovate, roundish or pear-shaped with its anterior end rounded, the posterior end acute and with the peristome complete. The thin and horny operculum is spirally marked and equally ovate, roundish or pear-shaped.

Habitat
This species can be found on brown algae (genus Fucus), in clefts of rocks, on stones, on mud or sand. Most will be found on sandy beaches along the line of the last tide.

Species
Species within the genus Rissoa include:

 Rissoa aartseni Verduin, 1985
 Rissoa acerosa Seguenza, 1903
 Rissoa acutata Schauroth, 1857 †
 Rissoa acuticosta (Sacco, 1895) † (Homonymy junior secondary homonym of R. acuticosta Von Koenen, 1892, which seems to be a true Rissoa)
 Rissoa acuticosta Von Koenen, 1892 †
 Rissoa adela d'Orbigny, 1852 †
 Rissoa aethiopica Thiele, 1925
 Rissoa albugo Watson, 1873
 † Rissoa alienocurta Lozouet, 1998 
 Rissoa alleryi (Nordsieck, 1972)
 Rissoa alpina Gümbel, 1861 †
 Rissoa angusticostata Sandberger, 1860 †
 Rissoa angustior (Monterosato, 1917) (taxon inquirendum)
 Rissoa anomala Eichwald, 1830 †
 Rissoa arata Philippi, 1849
 Rissoa athymorhyssa Dall, 1892 †
 Rissoa auriculata Seguenza, 1903
 Rissoa auriformis Pallary, 1904
 Rissoa auriscalpium (Linnaeus, 1758)
 Rissoa australis G. B. Sowerby II, 1877
 Rissoa baldacconii Cantraine, 1842 †
 Rissoa balliae W. Thompson, 1840
 Rissoa banatica Jekelius, 1944 †
 Rissoa basisulcata Etheridge & Bell in Bell, 1898 †
 Rissoa becki W. H. Turton, 1933
 Rissoa bissulca Buvignier, 1843 †
 Rissoa boytonensis Harmer, 1925 †
 Rissoa buccinalis (Lamarck, 1804) †
 Rissoa callistrophia Dall, 1892 †
 Rissoa candidata W. H. Turton, 1932
 Rissoa certa Svagrovský, 1971 †
 Rissoa clotho Hörnes, 1856 †
 Rissoa conica L. Périer, 1867
 Rissoa conuloidea Etheridge & Bell in Bell, 1893 †
 Rissoa cooperi Tryon, 1865
 Rissoa costeiensis Kowalke & Harzhauser, 2004 †
 Rissoa costellata Grateloup, 1838 †
 Rissoa crefeldensis Wiechmann, 1874 †
 Rissoa crux Eichwald, 1853 †
 Rissoa cureti Cossmann, 1918 †
 Rissoa curta Dall, 1927: (taxon inquirendum, non Dujardin, 1837)
 Rissoa curticostata S. V. Wood, 1848 †
 Rissoa cylindrella Odhner, 1924
 Rissoa decipiens Deshayes, 1861 †
 Rissoa decorata Philippi, 1846
 Rissoa decorticata Landau, Ceulemans & Van Dingenen, 2018 †
 Rissoa degrangei (Cossmann & Peyrot, 1919) †
 Rissoa densecosta Etheridge & Bell in Bell, 1893 †
 Rissoa dilemma O. Boettger, 1907 †
 Rissoa dissimilis Harmer, 1920 †
 Rissoa dobrogica Necrasov, 1936
 Rissoa duboisii Nyst, 1845 †
 Rissoa dupiniana d'Orbigny, 1842 †
 Rissoa electrae Manousis, 2019
 Rissoa elegantula Piette, 1857 †
 Rissoa epulata Pilsbry & C. W. Johnson, 1917 †
 Rissoa eurydictium Cossmann, 1888 †
 Rissoa euxinica Milaschevich, 1909
 Rissoa exigua Eichwald, 1830 †
 Rissoa flexuosa Von Koenen, 1892 †
 Rissoa fragilis (Lamarck, 1804) †
 Rissoa fraterna Wiechmann, 1874 †
 Rissoa frauenfeldiana Brusina, 1868
 Rissoa gemmula Fischer P. in de Folin, 1869
 Rissoa geraea Dall, 1892 †
 Rissoa gibsoni T. Brown, 1841 †
 Rissoa glabrata G. B. Sowerby II, 1859
 Rissoa goepperti Schauroth, 1857 †
 Rissoa gomerica (Nordsieck & Talavera, 1979)
 Rissoa gracilicosta Etheridge & Bell in Bell, 1893 †
 Rissoa granulum Philippi, 1844 (taxon inquirendum)
 Rissoa guerinii Récluz, 1843
 Rissoa guernei Dautzenberg, 1889
 Rissoa harmeri Faber, 2018 †
 Rissoa hebes O. Boettger, 1907 †
 Rissoa hidasensis Csepreghy-Meznerics, 1950 †
 Rissoa houdasi Cossmann, 1907
 Rissoa ilca Thiele, 1925
 Rissoa inchoata Deshayes, 1861 †
 Rissoa incompta A. A. Gould, 1862
 Rissoa incrassata J. Müller, 1851 †
 Rissoa inflexicosta (Cossmann, 1921) †
 Rissoa infrastriolata Thiele, 1925
 Rissoa innocens W. H. Turton, 1932
 Rissoa intermedia Grateloup, 1838 †
 Rissoa intusstriata Etheridge & Bell in Bell, 1893 †
 Rissoa irritans Thiele, 1925
 Rissoa italiensis Verduin, 1985
 Rissoa janusi (Nordsieck, 1972)
 Rissoa jurensis Etallon, 1862 †
 Rissoa karsteni R. Janssen, 1978 †
 Rissoa latior (Mighels & C. B. Adams, 1844)
 Rissoa leighi T. Brown, 1841 †
 Rissoa lia (Monterosato, 1884)
 Rissoa lilacina Récluz, 1843
 Rissoa lipeus Dall, 1892 †
 Rissoa lusoria Yokoyama, 1926 †
 Rissoa macra R. B. Watson, 1886
 Rissoa maya Yokoyama, 1926 †
 Rissoa membranacea (Adams J., 1800)
 Rissoa microcharia Dall, 1892 †
 Rissoa mirabilis Manzoni, 1868
 Rissoa misera Deshayes, 1861 †
 Rissoa mitreola Eichwald, 1853 †
 Rissoa modesta (H. C. Lea, 1845)
 Rissoa monodonta Philippi, 1836
 Rissoa moreana Buvignier, 1852 †
 Rissoa mosensis Buvignier, 1852 †
 Rissoa mucronata Svagrovský, 1971 †
 Rissoa multicincta (Smriglio & Mariottini, 1995)
 Rissoa multicostata (Nordsieck & Talavera, 1979)
 Rissoa munieri Szöts, 1953 †
 Rissoa nina Nordsieck, 1972 (nomen dubium)
 Rissoa obeliscoides Landau, Ceulemans & Van Dingenen, 2018 †
 Rissoa obeliscus May, 1915
 Rissoa obtusa T. Brown, 1841 †
 Rissoa olangoensis Poppe, Tagaro & Stahlschmidt, 2015 
 Rissoa oldhamiana Stoliczka, 1867 †
 Rissoa ovulum Philippi, 1844 †
 Rissoa pachia R. B. Watson, 1886
 Rissoa panhormensis Verduin, 1985
 Rissoa papuana Tapparone Canefri, 1877
 Rissoa paradoxa (Monterosato, 1884)
 Rissoa parva (da Costa, 1778)
 Rissoa patens A. A. Gould, 1862
 Rissoa paupera Thiele, 1925
 Rissoa peregra Thiele, 1925
 Rissoa perforata Thiele, 1925
 Rissoa perspecta E. A. Smith, 1904
 Rissoa phagon J. A. Gardner, 1947 †
 Rissoa plagiostoma Thiele, 1925
 Rissoa plica Can, 18444traine, 1842
 Rissoa pompholyx Dall, 1927
 Rissoa poustagnacensis Lozouet, 1998 †
 Rissoa pouweri Van Dingenen, Ceulemans & Landau, 2016 †
 Rissoa proditoris Thiele, 1925
 Rissoa pseudoguerini (Nordsieck & Talavera, 1979)
 Rissoa pseudoturricula Strausz, 1966 †
 Rissoa pucilla T. Brown, 1841 †
 Rissoa punctatissima R. Janssen, 1978 †
 Rissoa punctum Cantraine, 1842
 Rissoa quantilla W. H. Turton, 1932
 Rissoa quarantellii Brunetti & Vecchi, 2005 †
 Rissoa reussi Geinitz, 1875 †
 Rissoa rimata Philippi, 1844 †
 Rissoa robusta (H. C. Lea, 1845)
 Rissoa rodhensis Verduin, 1985
 Rissoa rufa Philippi, 1849
 Rissoa rufanensis W. H. Turton, 1933
 Rissoa rugosa Svagrovský, 1971 †
 Rissoa rustica R. B. Watson, 1886
 Rissoa sadoensis Yokoyama, 1926 †
 Rissoa sandbergeri J. Müller, 1851 †
 Rissoa sarae Brunetti, Cresti & Forli, 2017 †
 Rissoa scurra (Monterosato, 1917)
 Rissoa scutula Bell, 1892 †
 Rissoa searlesii Harmer, 1925 †
 Rissoa seguenzorum Bertolaso & Palazzi, 2000 †
 Rissoa selseyensis Harmer, 1925 †
 Rissoa semicarinata de Folin, 1870
 Rissoa semilaevis Von Koenen, 1892 †
 Rissoa senecta S. V. Wood, 1872 †
 Rissoa siberutensis Thiele, 1925
 Rissoa similis Scacchi, 1836
 Rissoa sismondiana Issel, 1869
 Rissoa sobieskii Friedberg, 1923 †
 Rissoa soceni Jekelius, 1944 †
 Rissoa solidula Philippi, 1849
 Rissoa sordida W. H. Turton, 1932
 Rissoa sowerbyi W. H. Turton, 1932
 Rissoa spinosa Seguenza †
 Rissoa splendida Eichwald, 1830
 Rissoa striatula Eichwald, 1830 †
 Rissoa strombecki Schauroth, 1857 †
 Rissoa subcarinta Cantraine, 1842 †
 Rissoa subclathrata Buvignier, 1852 †
 Rissoa sublachesis Zhizhchenko, 1936 †
 Rissoa submarginata d'Orbigny, 1850 †
 Rissoa subperforata Jeffreys, 1884 †
 Rissoa sulcifera G. B. Sowerby II, 1876
 Rissoa sumatrana Thiele, 1925
 Rissoa sundaica Thiele, 1925
 Rissoa suttonensis Harmer, 1925 †
 Rissoa tenuilineata (Cossmann, 1921) †
 Rissoa terebellum Philippi, 1844 †
 Rissoa terebralis Grateloup, 1838 †
 Rissoa teres W. H. Turton, 1932
 Rissoa texta Borchert, 1901 
 Rissoa tirolensis Koken in Wöhrmann & Koken, 1892 †
 Rissoa tomlini W. H. Turton, 1933
 Rissoa torquata Landau, Ceulemans & Van Dingenen, 2018 †
 Rissoa torquilla Pallary, 1912
 Rissoa trabeata Weisbord, 1962 †
 Rissoa triasina Schauroth, 1857 †
 Rissoa tristriata W. Thompson, 1840
 Rissoa tritonia W. H. Turton, 1932
 Rissoa tropica Stoliczka, 1868 †
 Rissoa turbinata (Lamarck, 1804) †
 Rissoa turbinopsis Deshayes, 1861 †
 Rissoa turricula Eichwald, 1830 †
 Rissoa umbilicata Philippi, 1851
 Rissoa undulata Deshayes, 1861 †
 Rissoa unisulca Buvignier, 1843 †
 Rissoa valfini Guirand & Ogérien, 1865 †
 Rissoa variabilis (Von Mühlfeldt, 1824) 
 Rissoa velata Zekeli, 1852 †
 Rissoa ventricosa Desmarest, 1814
 Rissoa venus d'Orbigny, 1852 †
 Rissoa venusta Philippi, 1844
 Rissoa verdensis Rolán & Oliveira, 2008
 Rissoa vicina Milaschevich, 1909
 Rissoa violacea Desmarest, 1814
 Rissoa virdunensis Buvignier, 1852 †
 Rissoa winkleri Müller, 1851 †
 Rissoa ziga De Gregorio, 1890 †
 Rissoa zosta Bayan, 1873 †

Synonyms
 Rissoa adarensis E.A. Smith, 1902: synonym of Onoba kergueleni (E. A. Smith, 1875)
 Rissoa albella Lovén, 1846: synonym of Pusillina sarsii (Lovén, 1846)
 Rissoa albella Alder, 1844: synonym of Rissoella diaphana (Alder, 1848)
 Rissoa albolirata Carpenter, 1864: synonym of Lirobarleeia albolirata (Carpenter, 1864)
 Rissoa alifera Thiele, 1925: synonym of Hoplopteron alifera (Thiele, 1925)
 Rissoa alveata Melvill & Standen, 1901: synonym of Iravadia quadrasi (O. Boettger, 1893)
 Rissoa atomus E. A. Smith, 1890 : synonym of Eatonina fulgida (Adams J., 1797)
 Rissoa australis Watson, 1886: synonym of Powellisetia australis (Watson, 1886)
 Rissoa basispiralis Grant-Mackie & Chapman-Smith, 1971 † a: synonym of Diala semistriata (Philippi, 1849)
 Rissoa boscii (Payraudeau, 1826): synonym of Melanella polita (Linnaeus, 1758)
 Rissoa calathus Forbes & Hanley, 1850: synonym of Alvania beanii (Hanley in Thorpe, 1844)
 Rissoa candidissima Webster, 1905 : synonym of Subonoba candidissima (Webster, 1905)
 Rissoa carnosa Webster, 1905: synonym of Fictonoba carnosa (Webster, 1905)
 Rissoa cazini Vélain, 1877: synonym of Pisinna cazini (Vélain, 1877)
 Rissoa cerithinum Philippi, 1849: synonym of Cerithidium cerithinum (Philippi, 1849)
 Rissoa columna Pelseneer, 1903: synonym of Onoba kergueleni (E. A. Smith, 1875)
 Rissoa corilea G. B. Sowerby II, 1876: synonym of Stosicia corilea (G. B. Sowerby II, 1876)
 Rissoa coronata Scacchi, 1844: synonym of Opalia hellenica (Forbes, 1844)
 Rissoa costata (J. Adams, 1796): synonym of Manzonia crassa (Kanmacher, 1798)
 Rissoa costulata Alder, 1844: synonym of Rissoa guerinii Récluz, 1843
 Rissoa crassicostata C. B. Adams, 1845: synonym of Opalia hotessieriana (d’Orbigny, 1842)
 Rissoa deserta E.A. Smith, 1907: synonym of Powellisetia deserta (E.A. Smith, 1907)
 Rissoa diaphana Alder, 1848: synonym of Rissoella diaphana (Alder, 1848)
 Rissoa dolium Nyst, 1845: synonym of Pusillina philippi (Aradas & Maggiore, 1844)
 Rissoa dubiosa C. B. Adams, 1850: synonym of Schwartziella dubiosa (C. B. Adams, 1850)
 Rissoa edgariana Melvill & Standen, 1907: synonym of Rissoa parva (da Costa, 1778)
 Rissoa edwardiensis Watson, 1886: synonym of Skenella edwardiensis (Watson, 1886)
 Rissoa emarginata Hutton, 1885: synonym of Nozeba emarginata (Hutton, 1885)
 Rissoa emblematica Hedley, 1906: synonym of Emblanda emblematica (Hedley, 1906)
 Rissoa eulimoides (C.B. Adams, 1850): synonym of Melanella eulimoides (C. B. Adams, 1850)
 Rissoa filostria Melvill & Standen, 1912: synonym of Onoba filostria (Melvill & Standen, 1912)
 Rissoa finckhi Hedley, 1899: synonym of Chrystella finckhi (Hedley, 1899)
 Rissoa garretti Tate, 1899: synonym of Iravadia quadrasi (O. Boettger, 1893)
 Rissoa georgiana Pfeffer, 1886: synonym of Onoba georgiana (Pfeffer, 1886)
 Rissoa gracilis Pease, 1860: synonym of Pyramidelloides angustus (Hedley, 1898)
 Rissoa griegi Friele, 1879: synonym of Cingula griegi (Friele, 1879)
 Rissoa grisea Martens, 1885: synonym of Onoba grisea (Martens, 1885)
 Rissoa inconspicua Alder, 1844: synonym of Pusillina inconspicua (Alder, 1844)
 Rissoa inconspicua C. B. Adams, 1852: synonym of Alvania monserratensis Baker, Hanna & Strong, 1930
 Rissoa inflatella Thiele, 1912: synonym of Onoba inflatella (Thiele, 1912)
 Rissoa infrequens C. B. Adams, 1852: synonym of Opalia infrequens (C. B. Adams, 1852)
 Rissoa integella Hedley, 1904: synonym of Attenuata integella (Hedley, 1904)
 Rissoa interrupta (J. Adams, 1800): synonym of Rissoa parva (da Costa, 1778)
 Rissoa janmayeni Friele, 1878: synonym of Frigidoalvania janmayeni (Friele, 1878)
 Rissoa kelseyi Dall & Bartsch, 1902: synonym of Lirobarleeia kelseyi (Dall & Bartsch, 1902)
 Rissoa kergueleni E. A. Smith, 1875: synonym of Onoba kergueleni (E. A. Smith, 1875)
 Rissoa labiosa (Montagu, 1803): synonym of Rissoa membranacea (J. Adams, 1800)
 Rissoa laevigata C. B. Adams, 1850: synonym of Zebina browniana (d'Orbigny, 1842)
 Rissoa lantzi Vélain, 1877: synonym of Onoba lantzi (Vélain, 1877)
 Rissoa lineolata Michaud, 1830: synonym of Pusillina lineolata (Michaud, 1832)
 Rissoa lirata Carpenter, 1857: synonym of Lirobarleeia lirata (Carpenter, 1857)
 Rissoa marionensis Watson, 1886: synonym of Eatoniella subrufescens (E.A. Smith, 1875)
 Rissoa miliaris Thiele, 1912: synonym of Skenella sinapi (Watson, 1886)
 Rissoa observationis Thiele, 1912: synonym of Onoba kergueleni (E. A. Smith, 1875)
 Rissoa ordinaria E. A. Smith, 1890: synonym of Eatoniella ordinaria (E. A. Smith, 1890)
 Rissoa paucilirata Melvill & Standen, 1912: synonym of Onoba paucilirata (Melvill & Standen, 1912)
 Rissoa pelseneeri Thiele, 1912: synonym of Powellisetia pelseneeri (Thiele, 1912)
 Rissoa porifera (Lovén, 1843): synonym of Rissoa lilacina Récluz, 1843
 Rissoa principis Watson, 1886: synonym of Powellisetia principis (Watson, 1886)
 Rissoa proxima Forbes & Hanley, 1850: synonym of Ceratia proxima (Forbes & Hanley, 1850)
 Rissoa punctatostriata Tenison Woods, 1879: synonym of Leucotina casta (A. Adams, 1853)
 Rissoa punctulum Philippi, 1836: synonym of Pisinna glabrata (Von Mühlfeldt, 1824)
 Rissoa rufilabris Alder, 1844: synonym of Rissoa lilacina Récluz, 1843
 Rissoa rufilabrum Alder, 1844: synonym of Rissoa lilacina Récluz, 1843
 Rissoa sarsii Lovén, 1846: synonym of Pusillina sarsii (Lovén, 1846)
 Rissoa scalarella C. B. Adams, 1845: synonym of Schwartziella scalarella (C. B. Adams, 1845)
 Rissoa scotiana Melvill & Standen, 1907: synonym of Onoba semicostata (Montagu, 1803)
 Rissoa semistriata Philippi, 1849: synonym of Diala semistriata (Philippi, 1849)
 Rissoa sinapi Watson, 1886: synonym of Skenella sinapi (Watson, 1886)
 Rissoa sinuosa Scacchi, 1836: synonym of Melanella sinuosa (Scacchi, 1836)
 Rissoa striata (J. Adams, 1797): synonym of Onoba semicostata (Montagu, 1803)
 Rissoa striatula Jeffreys, 1847: synonym of Ceratia proxima (Forbes & Hanley, 1850)
 Rissoa studeriana Thiele, 1912: synonym of Onoba steineni (Strebel, 1908)
 Rissoa suavis Thiele, 1925: synonym of Onoba suavis (Thiele, 1925)
 Rissoa subangulata C.B. Adams, 1850: synonym of Schwartziella bryerea (Montagu, 1803)
 Rissoa subantarctica Thiele, 1912: synonym of Onoba subantarctica (Thiele, 1912)
 Rissoa subcostulata Schwartz, 1864: synonym of Rissoa guerinii Récluz, 1843
 Rissoa subtruncata Pelseneer, 1903: synonym of Powellisetia pelseneeri (Thiele, 1912)
 Rissoa subtruncata Vélain, 1877: synonym of Scrobs subtruncata (Vélain, 1877)
 Rissoa syngenes (A. E. Verril, 1884): synonym of Alvania syngenes (A. E. Verrill, 1884)
 Rissoa transenna Watson, 1886: synonym of Onoba transenna (Watson, 1886) 
 Rissoa valdiviae Thiele, 1925: synonym of Onoba steineni (Strebel, 1908)
 Rissoa venusta Garrett, 1873: synonym of Iravadia quadrasi (O. Boettger, 1893)
 Rissoa vitrea C. B. Adams, 1850: synonym of Zebina vitrea (C. B. Adams, 1850)
 Rissoa xanthias Watson, 1886: synonym of Benthonellania xanthias (Watson, 1886)
 Rissoa xanthias var. acuticostata Dall, 1889: synonym of Benthonellania acuticostata (Dall, 1889)

References

 Nordsieck, F. (1972). Die europäischen Meeresschnecken (Opisthobranchia mit Pyramidellidae; Rissoacea). Vom Eismeer bis Kapverden, Mittelmeer und Schwarzes Meer. Gustav Fischer, Stuttgart. XIII + 327 pp.
 Vaught, K.C. (1989). A classification of the living Mollusca. American Malacologists: Melbourne, FL (USA). . XII, 195 pp.
 Gofas, S.; Le Renard, J.; Bouchet, P. (2001). Mollusca, in: Costello, M.J. et al. (Ed.) (2001). European register of marine species: a check-list of the marine species in Europe and a bibliography of guides to their identification. Collection Patrimoines Naturels, 50: pp. 180–213

External links
 Desmarest A. G. (1814). Description des coquilles univalves du genre Rissoa de M. De Fréminville. Bulletin des Sciences, par la Société Philomatique de Paris. 1814: 7-9, pl. 1.
 Leach W. E. (1852). Molluscorum Britanniae Synopsis. A synopsis of the Mollusca of Great Britain arranged according to their natural affinities and anatomical structure. London pp. VIII + 376
 Monterosato, T. A. di. (1884). Nomenclatura generica e specifica di alcune conchiglie mediterranee. Virzi, printed for the author, Palermo, 152 pp
 Bucquoy E., Dautzenberg P. & Dollfus G. (1882-1886). Les mollusques marins du Roussillon. Tome Ier. Gastropodes. Paris: Baillière & fils. 570 pp., 66 pls.
  Ponder W. F. (1985). A review of the Genera of the Rissoidae (Mollusca: Mesogastropoda: Rissoacea). Records of the Australian Museum supplement 4: 1-221

Rissoidae
Gastropod genera